was an ace fighter pilot in the Imperial Japanese Navy (IJN) during World War II.  Participating in many of the Pacific War battles and campaigns as a member of several units, Minami was officially credited with destroying 15 enemy aircraft.  He was killed in November 1944 attempting to crash his aircraft into enemy ships off Leyte as a participant in Kamikaze operations.

References

1915 births
1944 deaths
Kamikaze pilots
Japanese naval aviators
Japanese World War II flying aces
Japanese military personnel killed in World War II
Military personnel from Kagawa Prefecture
Imperial Japanese Navy officers